One Wild Night Tour was a worldwide tour in support of Bon Jovi's seventh studio album Crush (2000).

Background
Originally, One Wild Night Tour planned to kick off the tour in Japan, but instead decided to headline the charity concert on Melbourne's Colonial Stadium on March 24, 2001, which purpose to raise funds for flood-stricken farmers. There were 34,000 attenders and the concert grossed $850,000. Because of the falling Australian dollar, production costs soared close $500,000 and it involved transporting 70 tons of Bon Jovi's equipment in a jumbo jet from the United States. Paul Krige, managing director of Universal Music Australia, said that A$300,000 were made from ticket sales alone. Approximately $50,000 were raised from telethon that was hold nationally on April 15, 2001. by Seven Network, which screened the concert on that day. Proceeds went to State Emergency Services and Volunteer Bushfire Service. Six tracks from Bon Jovi's set were included on Australian only bonus CD of the Bon Jovi's debut live album One Wild Night Live 1985-2001 (2001).

Japanese leg of the tour kicked off in Yokohama with two concerts in Yokohama Arena on March 28 and 29, 2001. Japanese leg of the tour lasted until April 5, 2001. Following five shows in Japan, band embarked on the first North American leg of the tour on April 18, 2001, playing concerts in arenas and amphitheaters. Through May 2001, band headed to Europe for a month of concerts before returning to United States for a series of concerts that culminated with July 27 show at Giants Stadium in New Jersey. A special pre-sale promotion was hold for the concerts in United States, where half of tickets in all price ranges were available through Ticketmaster's official website at least two days before the public on sale date. Fans who registered at the band's official website by February 21, 2001. had the opportunity to purchase a maximum of four tickets. Also as a bonus, those who registered automatically entered into a contest to win a guitar autographed by the band members.

Personnel
Jon Bon Jovi - lead vocals, guitar, maracas for Keep the Faith, tambourine for Hey God
Richie Sambora - lead guitar, backing vocals, talkbox
David Bryan - keyboards, backing vocals
Tico Torres - drums, percussion
Hugh McDonald - bass, backing vocals
Alec John Such – bass (Guest at two shows)

Tour dates

Box office score data

From the 19 shows reported from Billboard, the One Wild Night Tour grossed a total of $17,143,241 with a total attendance of 391,321.

Set list 
The songs "It's My Life", "One Wild Night", "Just Older", "You Give Love a Bad Name", "Bad Medicine" and "I'll Sleep When I'm Dead" were played at every concert of the tour. "Livin' on a Prayer", "Wanted Dead or Alive" and "Born to Be My Baby" were left out only once. In general most songs played were from the album Crush. 
Like usual for Bon Jovi, the setlist changed from show to show. 
This is the setlist from the show at Corel Centre, Ottawa, Canada from May 17, 2001:

 "One Wild Night"
 "You Give Love a Bad Name"
 "It's My Life"
 "Keep the Faith" (with snippets of "Sympathy for the Devil")
 "Livin' on a Prayer"
 "Born to Be My Baby"
 "Bed of Roses"
 "Someday I'll Be Saturday Night"
 "I Got The Girl"
 "Just Older"
 "Blaze of Glory"
 "I'll Be There for You"
 "Lay Your Hands on Me"
 "I'll Sleep When I'm Dead"
 "Bad Medicine" (with snippets of "Shout")
Encore 1:
 "In These Arms"
 "Say It Isn't So"
 "Wanted Dead or Alive"
Encore 2:
 "Tequila"
 "Twist and Shout"

References

External links
www.drycounty.com – http://drycounty.com/tour/2001own.html

Bon Jovi concert tours
2001 concert tours